Tall Grass & Cool Water is the thirty-first album by American singer-songwriter Michael Martin Murphey, his third album of bluegrass music, and his sixth album of cowboy music.

Track listing
 "Texas Cowboy" (Murphey) – 2:56
 "Cool Water" (Nolan) – 5:21
 "Santa Fe Trail" (Murphey) – 4:01
 "Way Out There" (Nolan) – 4:21
 "The Railroad Corral" (Murphey) – 4:08
 "Partner to the Wind" (Murphey) – 4:50
 "Trusty Lariat" (Murphey) – 4:12
 "Ballad of Cole Younger" (Murphey) – 4:56
 "Ballad of Jesse James" (Murphey) – 4:34
 "Frank James Farewell" (Burr, Ketchum) – 4:28
 "Blue Prairie" (Nolan, Spencer, Taft) – 3:42
 "Springtime in the Rockies" (Murphey) – 4:23

Credits
Music
 Michael Martin Murphey – vocals, acoustic guitar, executive producer
 Ryan Murphey – acoustic guitar, mandolin, producer
 Carin Mari – vocals
 Pat Flynn – lead acoustic guitar
 Andy Hall – dobro
 Charlie Cushman – banjo
 Troy Engle – banjo, fiddle
 Sam Bush – mandolin, fiddle
 Andy Leftwich – mandolin, fiddle
 Craig Nelson – acoustic bass
 Matt Pierson – acoustic bass

Production
 Keith Compton – engineer
 Charles Engel – album art
 Joe Ownbey – photography

Chart performance

References
Notes

Citations

External links
 Michael Martin Murphey's Official Website

2011 albums
Bluegrass albums
Michael Martin Murphey albums
Western music (North America) albums